The following is a comprehensive list of characters from the Soulcalibur series of video games, beginning with Soul Edge (Soul Blade) in 1995.

Overview
The Soulcalibur series is a weapon-based fighting game franchise developed by Namco Bandai's Project Soul division. Set in the period of late 16th to early 17th century, the plot of the games revolve around Soul Edge, a cursed sword able to possess its wielder and devour souls. Its spirit is called Inferno, and his avatar/host is called Nightmare. Soul Calibur, a holy sword and Soul Edge's antithesis, also has a spirit called Elysium.

With each character, their weapon was decided upon before other aspects were. The design was then built to revolve around it, starting with gender, then physical measurements, and lastly background details. Once established, appearance and movement were fleshed out by the team's concept artist and rendered as a 3D model by a design team that worked solely on the character. The completed model was then animated by a motion capture artist working directly with the team. During this phase the team additionally worked with the story creators, refining the character's own role in the plot as needed throughout development. In the course of the series, two characters have been an exception to the process: Johan Druer, a berserker exclusive to the Japanese player's guide, and Necrid, a character co-produced with Todd McFarlane that appears in Soulcalibur II.

Starting with Soulcalibur II, guest characters from other franchises or companies were introduced for different home ports of the game, with The Legend of Zeldas Link appearing for the GameCube version, comic book character Spawn for the Xbox, and Tekkens Heihachi Mishima for the PlayStation 2. Despite rumors of Devil May Crys Dante's inclusion in Soulcalibur III, developers confirmed no plans for the inclusion of guest characters for the title, with series producer Hiroaki Yotoriyama stating "It’s my policy to never do the same thing twice." However, under new producer Katsutoshi Sasaki the concept was revisited in later titles in the series, with Tales of Symphonias Lloyd Irving appearing in Soulcalibur Legends, Star Wars characters The Apprentice, Yoda and Darth Vader appearing in Soulcalibur IV, with the latter two exclusively to the Xbox 360 and PlayStation 3 versions respectively until later released as downloadable content, God of Wars Kratos for Soulcalibur: Broken Destiny, and Ezio Auditore da Firenze from the Assassin's Creed franchises for Soulcalibur V. Devil Jin from Tekken was also added to Soulcalibur V as a non-playable character and his moveset can only be accessed by creating a character that uses his style of fighting. Soulcalibur VI added Geralt of Rivia from The Witcher, 2B from Nier: Automata and Haohmaru from Samurai Shodown as guest characters.

Main series

Main characters

Bonus and guest characters

Notes:

Spin-offs

Notes:

Introduced in Soul Edge

Cervantes

Hwang
Voiced by (English): SungWon Cho (SCVI (Version 2.30))
Voiced by (Japanese): Toshiyuki Morikawa (SE (Arcade)); Wataru Takagi (SE (Console)~SC); Naoki Imamura (SCIII); Subaru Kimura (SCVI)

, a man with a strong sense of justice, joined Korea's coast guard and was sent to find the "Sword of Salvation", which in reality is the cursed sword Soul Edge, in order to protect his country. However he returned after learning of an impending Japanese invasion of his homeland, bringing his friend's daughter, Seong Mi-Na, back with him. When he set out after her again, he discovered the true nature of the sword and informed his superiors of it. They dismissed him as a result, but upon learning that the Japanese were also after the sword he was instead sent to stop them. Heading westward, he plans to join forces with Mi-na to destroy the blade. In Soulcalibur IV, he was in Ostrheinsburg when he crossed paths with Hong Yun-seong, a student of the Seong dojo. Hwang tried to warn him the danger of Soul Edge, though the young warrior did not heed his warning and continued his journey to find the sword. After the Soul Edge is destroyed, he is deemed a national hero and begins training the new generation alongside Mi-Na and Yun-seong.

In a new timeline depicted in Soulcalibur VI, Hwang was forcefully being implanted with the evil seed and almost transformed into a malfested by Won Gabok, a servant of Soul Edge. He managed to injure himself and was thought to have committed suicide. However, Hwang survived and was saved by Woo Soo-yun, an ally of the Aval Organization and by extension, the Wolfkrone Kingdom, including Hwang’s deceased parents. Hwang masters taoism for three months to suppress the malfestation from taking over his body and countermeasure any other malfestation threats.

During development several weapons were considered, including a zhanmadao like Seong Mi-Na's and a bladed nunchaku like Li Long's. Several different outfit components were also considered at this time, such as the inclusion of head and/or arm guards and an arm bandana. With Hwang's appearance in Soulcalibur his attire was changed. Chinese style costumes were considered, including an outfit with an open jacket and a bandaged design with a Chinese martial artist's attire. The developers based his look around the concept of a traveler, implementing subtle hints such as his torn pant legs. Hwang appears in Soulcalibur VI, although he was not playable until being made available as downloadable content. He eventually learns a taoism to combine its power with his original sword technique.

Inferno

Li Long

Mitsurugi

Rock
Voiced by (English): Robert Belgrade (SE)Voiced by (Japanese): Takashi Nagasako (SE~SC); Minoru Inaba (SCIII); Tōru Ōkawa (SCIV~)

His father managed to bid Soul Edge at one auction and was about to take it home, only for the ship to be attacked by pirate Cervantes who killed everyone except Rock, who washed up in the shores of America with his memories gone. The Native Americans were unwilling to help Rock due to his size and only a boy named Bangoo was unafraid to befriend him. Rock eventually recovered his memories over time and left America in search of Soul Edge, which may become the key to his full memories. Through Sophitia's words, he returned to care for Bangoo, only to find him being kidnapped by Aeon Calcos/Lizardman whose cult demanded Rock's soul. He crossed back to Europe and rescued Bangoo. They stayed in Europe for several years until Bangoo grew older, after which Bangoo went to America by himself. Later, Rock is attacked by a giant named Astaroth whose moves have an uncanny resemblance to his own. He learned that Astaroth was created by Lizardman's cult based on his image and is now serving Nightmare. Rock is determined to stop him at all costs. His fate afterward is not known, as no explanation is given for his absence in Soulcalibur V.

Initially during development, the character was called "Beast Warrior", and his design changed little over the course of creating the character. His appearance is intended to reflect the atmosphere of a wild warrior, while his facial expressions were drawn in a positive manner, intended to show him enjoying the fight. When developing his appearance for Soulcalibur, a clothed design and a bald appearance were both rejected, as the team felt they gave the impression of an urban or "bad guy" character, respectively.

Seong Han-myeong
 is the father of Seong Mi-na and the owner of the Seong dojo. He only appeared as a secret character in the console version of Soul Edge, utilizing a Chinese sword akin to Hwang. After his wife and son both died of illness, he trained his daughter in martial arts but wished her to stay home, despite her rebellious nature. He became interested in a student of his, Hwang Seong-gyeong, and tried to adopt him as his successor, although Hwang politely rejected the offer. Regardless, Han-myeong planned to marry his daughter with Hwang, which only caused Mi-na to run away from home for months, although she was eventually dragged back home by Hwang. When a malfested army invades his dojang to hunt Mi-na for her involvement and lure Hwang (who is now also a Taoist in Soulcalibur VI), Han-myeong learns Soul Edge’s evil nature from his student. Later, another student of his, Hong Yun-seong ran away from his dojo to find Soul Edge and Han-myeong reluctantly gave his blessing to his daughter in an attempt to find him, yet entrust her to prevent Yun-seong from nearing Soul Edge.

Seong Mi-na
Voiced by (English): Molly Lin (SCII); Erika Lenhart (SCIII~SC:BD); Erica Mendez (SCVI)Voiced by (Japanese): Hekiru Shiina (SE (Arcade)); Yūko Miyamura (SE (Console)); Houko Kuwashima (SC~SCIII); Sanae Kobayashi (SCIV~SC:BD); Chinatsu Akasaki (SCVI)

 is a young Korean woman, excelling at weapon usage but regarded as simply a girl by her peers. Barred from joining the coast guard due to her gender, she sought out the rumored "Sword of Salvation", which in actuality was Soul Edge, to prove herself. Hwang eventually caught up with her and dragged her back home, but she set out again after her father's efforts to marry her to him became unbearable. Encountering another female warrior named Ivy, she challenged her but was quickly defeated, and learned from Ivy that not only was she still inexperienced but that the sword she sought was inherently evil. She later challenged an alcoholic armed with a bō staff who also quickly defeated her. Seong Mi-na requested training from him, and he taught her all his skills, revealing in a farewell letter his name as "Kong Xiuqiang", the long-lost father of Xianghua. However, before she set out she was dragged home once more by Hwang. She later encountered Hong Yun-seong, a student of her father angry after being disregarded by Hwang when he challenged him to a duel. Feeling sorry for him, she handed him her family heirloom, the dao 'White Storm', and later that night he set out himself after Soul Edge. Mi-na set out to retrieve the dao from him, this time with her father's blessing. Afterward, Mi-na met with an old man, Edge Master, who quickly defeated her in their battle, at which point he trained her for some time. She eventually confronted Yun-seong and together with his companion, Talim tried to convince him to abandon his quest, though he did not heed their warnings and left on his own one night while both women were asleep. Mi-na then promised Talim that she will find Yun-seong before they parted their ways. She is finally reunited with Yun-seong after the destruction of Soul Edge and the two go back home. Upon returning she is deemed as a national hero and begins training the younger generation with Hwang.

The new timeline reiterates Mi-na's adventures as she runs away from home to avoid marriage, loses to Ivy and Xiuqiang, and trains under the latter. She then goes on a dangerous mission to stop a cult from targeting a village and nearly gets killed. But Mi-na is saved by Hwang and the villagers, who were inspired by her bravery. She then reluctantly allows Hwang to take her home. Due to her infiltration at a base of Soul Edge’s servants, she was targeted by the evil sword’s servant Won Gabok, but was saved by Hwang and learned the true nature of Soul Edge. Her distaste towards Soul Edge and its evil nature has since becoming the reason she, Hwang and Talim tries to prevent Yun-seong from nearing it.

In a 2002 poll by Namco prior to the release of Soulcalibur II regarding their favorite character, Seong Mi-Na placed first with little under 20% of the tally, just ahead of runner-up Sophitia (18%).

Siegfried

Sophitia

Taki

Voldo

Introduced in Soulcalibur

Arthur
Arthur (アーサー Āsā?) is a playable character introduced in the first Soulcalibur, where he replaced Mitsurugi in Korea due to the local sensibilities regarding the subject of the samurai. Arthur is an orphaned European who has become a swordsman in Japan. In his first appearance, he looks exactly like Mitsurugi except with blond hair and an eye patch, and his weapon, movelist and ending are identical to Mitsurugi's. Arthur returned as a bonus character in all versions of Soulcalibur III, representing the "Katana" Create-a-Fighter discipline. In this game he is given unique facial characteristics and a weapon of his own, with his outfit based on that of Mitsurugi in Soulcalibur II. Arthur's Destined Battle enemy in Soulcalibur is against Taki (the same as Mitsurugi's), while in Soulcalibur III it is Mitsurugi.

Astaroth

Edge Master
Voiced by: Daisuke Gōri (SC); Kōji Ishii (SCV)

 has a mysterious past; renowned for his skill with various weapons, his past and real name are known only to himself. He served as advisor and teacher at the Ling-Sheng Su Temple, before it was destroyed by the "Evil Seed" event. Taking in the only survivor of the event, Kilik, he taught him to suppress the evil within himself and sent him to destroy Soul Edge, before departing on a quest of his own. After Soul Edge is shattered by Kilik's companion, Xianghua, he gave her an unnamed Jian and returned to training Kilik in hermitage until Kilik went on his second quest to destroy Soul Edge. Later, he returned to training him when he is carried unconscious by Xianghua (after their fight with Zasalamel) for three months, until he left on his own after receiving a purifying blow from Edge Master and Xianghua's letter. Around this time, he is also challenged by Seong Mi-na, who is swiftly defeated, and trained her for some time upon her request. In the seventeen-year gap between Soulcalibur IV and V, he taught another of Kilik's companion, Maxi to control the Soul Edge's shard in his body and warned him to bequeath Kali-Yuga to Xiba, as Kilik's life is in great danger. Leaving his hermitage a second time, he entered Astral Chaos to prevent the Hero King, Algol from corrupting the world with the realm's energies.

Although not playable in Soulcalibur VI, Edge Master appears in the story mode as Kilik's mentor, Taki's ally in keeping Mitsurugi away from Soul Edge, and a helper to guest character, Geralt of Rivia, in getting the witcher back to his world.

Edge Master was created by illustrator Yasushi Nirasawa, who had designed him as a background character and weapon shop owner for Soul Edge Official Guidebook – Densetsu Buki Tankyū no Sho. Out of appreciation, Namco later introduced him as a playable character in Soulcalibur and a recurring series element. His age is intended to reflect his experience and strength.

Ivy

Kilik
Voiced by (English): Scott Reyns (SCII); Grant George (SCIII~)Voiced by (Japanese): Sōichirō Hoshi

 as an infant was left on the steps of a temple in China. He grew up with Xianglian, a fellow monk whom Kilik had seen as his own sister. He was trained in the art of staff-fighting and inherited one of the temple's treasure Kali-Yuga. However, during the night of the "Evil Seed", Kilik and other monks were possessed and fought each other. Xianglian used her inheritance Dvapara-Yuga to stop Kilik, but ended up possessed which forced Kilik to kill her. Sane once more, he came under the tutelage of Edge Master, and joined forces with Maxi and Xianghua (unknowingly Xianglian's sister) to destroy Soul Edge and purge the evil within himself. They confronted Nightmare during his Soul Edge ritual and Kilik managed to defeat him. He returned to hone his skills with Edge Master, but sensed Soul Edge's return four years later that made him travel around the world with Xianghua once again. The two confronted Zasalamel in a corrupted city where Kilik was knocked unconscious by him. He awoke a month later in Edge Master's home and began to train his skills again, determined to search Soul Edge with Xianghua again. While traveling with Xianghua, he realized that he had feelings for her, but he cannot confess it as she reminded him of the late Xianglian, so he planned to leave her when the time is right. During the seventeen-year gap of Soulcalibur IV and Soulcalibur V, the two reunited where Kilik had an intimate meeting with Xianghua that conceived Xiba, but left her before Xiba was born. He then spent his time trying to close the astral gates, where he touched the souls of those who had wandered the Astral Chaos and made him able to learn their styles.

The new timeline not only retells Kilik's tragic past in the Ling-Shang Su temple massacre, but also reveals his malfested form because of the Evil Seed, and his rivalry with new character, Grøh. Throughout his journey with Xianghua and Maxi, Kilik is constantly troubled over Xianglian's death, but is aided by Sophitia, who helps him cope with his past. In the battle against Inferno, Kilik saves Xianghua with control over his malfestation as Grøh did before him, and the pair defeat Inferno.

Kilik's name is derived from Turkish kılıç, meaning "sword." During Kilik's initial design creation, while the weapon selected remained constant several ages and related appearances were considered. In particular amongst these was suggested a young boy whose design was based upon the legendary Chinese character Sun Wukong, the Monkey King. Other designs such as a feral appearance were considered, but unused due to them feeling "pretty wild" and too different from the initial concept.

Lizardman (Aeon Calcos)
, like Sophitia Alexandra, was one of the warriors to receive an oracle from the god Hephaestus to destroy Soul Edge. A group of desert travelers rescued a dehydrated Aeon and brought him to their village. About to repay them by teaching them swordplay, the "Evil Seed" event occurred and turned him into a crazed killer that massacred everyone in the village. Ordered to bring Rock's adopted son to Europe, he was defeated while pursuing Soul Edge, which was destroyed moments later. Freed from his brainwashed state, he tried to restore his human form but was unable to and thus blamed Hephaestus for abandoning him. His state deteriorated further, gradually losing his humanity and memories. Taken in by a group of lizardmen like himself, he realized he lost his soul to Soul Edge, and sought to reclaim it. By the time of Soulcalibur V, Lizardman's continued battles have changed his form to the point where he has grown wings and is able to breathe fire, resembling a dragon. Lizardman went through a few changes through his initial development, with several drafts remaining consistent in their design. However, at one point it was proposed to have the characters be exactly "half human, half reptile", and as a result in terrible pain.

Maxi
Voiced by (English): Doug Boyd (SCII); Steve Van Wormer (SCIII~)Voiced by (Japanese): Nobutoshi Canna (SC~SCIII); Kenjiro Tsuda (SCIV~SCBD); Shigeo Kiyama (SCV~)

 was a wandering pirate from Shuri in the Ryūkyū Kingdom (present-day Okinawa, Japan). He fights using nunchaku after learning techniques from "Zhang Wu", an alias for the assassin Li Long. He pursues the golem Astaroth, who attacked his ship and slaughtered his crewmates, joining forces with Kilik and Xianghua. Maxi defeats Astaroth but is critically wounded as a result. He is later found by some villagers who help nurse him back to health using fragments of Soul Edge. He eventually pursues Soul Edge in order to use it to kill Astaroth so he will die, planning to himself die shortly afterward. In Soulcalibur IV, Maxi managed to kill Astaroth, though he had decided not to kill himself and instead went to train with Edge Master to control the shards of Soul Edge in his body, which had stopped his body from aging. After seventeen years, he is sent by Edge Master to bequeath Kali-Yuga to a boy named Xiba, as his friend, Kilik's destiny is in great danger. He became a leader of a group consisting of himself, Xiba, Leixia, and Natsu. The group meet Patroklos during his journey and help him restore Soul Calibur back to its full form.

The new timeline goes into further on how Maxi loses his crew to Astaroth, and on his journey with Kilik and Xianghua to avenge his brothers. It also reveals Grøh found Maxi injured after the latter’s first victory against Astaroth.

After initially considering having Li Long return for Soulcalibur, the development team instead focused on creating a new, younger nunchaku wielder for the title. After considering several ideas for his hairstyle, including several gag designs, the developers initially chose to give him dreadlocks before changing to the current appearance. Additionally, they opted to give him an outfit that would make him attractive.

Nightmare

Xianghua
Voiced by (English): Wendee Lee
Voiced by (Japanese): Aya Hisakawa (SCI-III), Ryōko Shintani (SCIV), Aya Suzaki (SCVI)
 is the daughter of a seasoned female warrior and a monk. Her mother eventually abandoned her father, and taught her how to fight using a battered tai chi jian, in reality a stolen holy weapon called the Krita-Yuga from her father's temple in disguise. Eventually Xianghua became a member of the Chinese Imperial Guards, and was sent after the "Hero's Sword", which in reality was Soul Edge. Encountering Kilik and Maxi, they joined forces and defeated first Nightmare, then Inferno in its own realm. With her weapon revealing its true form as Soul Calibur, Soul Edge's antithesis, they defeated Inferno and escaped, though at the loss of the sword. Four years later, though falling out of favor with the Chinese royalty, she continued along Kilik to hunt down and destroy Soul Edge when it resurfaced. While she and Kilik was trying to purge a corrupted city, they met with Zasalamel who knocked Kilik unconscious while Xianghua was unable to do anything. She carried Kilik to Edge Master's home and spent the next month honing her skills. She joined with Kilik again to find Soul Edge, where she realized she had feelings for him, but cannot confess it. The two parted ways after Soul Edge is destroyed, but reunited a year later where they had an intimate meeting, but Kilik left Xianghua shortly thereafter. She realized that she was pregnant with Kilik's child and was ordered by her grandfather to kill the child, considering it as a heresy. The Chinese general Yan Wujin however, negotiated to allow the child to live as a condition for marrying Xianghua. She then named the child Xiba and left him to live with her father Kong Xiuqiang, after which she had two children with Wujin, Leixia and Leixin.

During Xianghua's early design phase, several concepts were considered for her attire, before settling upon a light and oriental appearance for her. Additionally it was considered to have her appear as a young girl instead, or alternatively for her to fight unarmed using martial arts, an idea later put to effect through Heihachi Mishima and his appearance in Soulcalibur II.

Dreamcast Magazine ranked her as the seventh top "girl on the Dreamcast" in 2000, commenting: "With an oriental flavour to her moves and style, Xianghua is a bit of a minx even though she looks sweet and innocent." According to IGN's Jesse Schedeen "Xianghua may be traditional in some ways, but she certainly doesn't dress like it. She has one of the more unique costumes in Soulcalibur IV, a hodgepodge of different Oriental fashions that come together in one sexy look. Never before has a kung fu hero been such a babe." In 2014, Julia Cook of Paste ranked Xianghua as the second "best dressed lady" in all video games for her collection of varied "tight outfits with flowy, feminine accoutrements" from "brightly colored capris under dresses or robes, sometimes with a sleek tiara" in early games to "a more masculine blazer and shorts combination for Soul Calibur IV."

Yoshimitsu

Introduced in Soulcalibur II
In addition to the characters below, lesser storyline related characters were included in console versions of the title as unlockable characters, appearing as recurring enemies in the game's "Weapon Master Mode". Assassin and Berserker served as counterparts to previous characters Hwang and Rock. Both would later appear as boss enemies in Soulcalibur III, with Assassin's fighting style modified to utilize a kunai and Berserker modified into a smaller, fully armored warrior armed with a lance. Several generic Lizardmen also appear as recurring enemies and an unlockable character, utilizing an axe and shield fighting style that would be used by the original Lizardman in later appearances of the character.

Cassandra

Charade
 is the name of a creature introduced in Soulcalibur II, formed from Soul Edge's fragments and various reshaped human body parts. It has no intellect, instead acting on instinct and a desire to absorb other pieces of Soul Edge. It was once a man who collected fragments of Soul Edge but was murdered and in his final moments had him mutated into Charade. It mimics fighting styles and weapons by scanning the minds of its opponents, represented in Soulcalibur II by his use of a random fighting style from one of the other game's characters. In the arcade version of Soulcalibur II, Charade served as the final boss, and was unlocked for players to use after the game had been in operation a certain amount of time. For console ports of the title, Charade was replaced by Inferno as the game's final boss, and was made into a regular unlockable character. A Charade appears as a boss in Soulcalibur III in a three-round match in which it progressively loses components of itself between each round, eventually reduced to just its eye. It presumably became one with Soul Edge/Nightmare.

Charades appear in the game Namco × Capcom as enemy characters, mimicking Sophitia's fighting style from Soulcalibur II. These Charades are unique in that Soul Edge creates them directly, an ability it lacks in the Soul series. Called Soul Edge's "avatars" by the game's protagonists, they are created by Soul Edge as foot soldiers and as a means to protect itself. When defeated, they will melt and dissolve into nothing.

Reception to Charade has been mixed. Netjack's Steve Lubitz described Charade as "Weapon Master, only uglier" and cited a lack of creativity with the design. The sentiment was shared by Deeko's review of Soulcalibur II, who said that Charade felt like a new character that used "old character moves and tactics". Other reviewers of II repeated the sentiment, noting Charade as one of several "Doppelgänger" fighters in the title that filled in another character's role. On the other hand, UGO's Doug Trueman cited Charade as a character that "[added] something spectacular to the Soul Calibur pantheon." and additionally received mention in UGO's "Top 11 Soul Calibur Fighters" article, losing to Olcadan only due to Olcadan's owl-inspired design.

Yun-seong
Voiced by (English): Jim Singer (SCII)Voiced by (Japanese): Kōsuke Toriumi

 was introduced in Soulcalibur II as a student at the Seong dojo and had idolized Hwang Seong-gyeong, a Korean warrior sent to find the "Sword of Salvation". When Hwang rejected his attempt to challenge him, the dojo's daughter Seong Mi-na handed Yun-seong the White Storm, a dao capable of reflecting the user's inner thoughts. He decided to leave his dojo in search of the "Sword of Salvation". During his journey, he met a group of deserted children whose leader is sick as well as a teenager named Talim, who warned him about the dangers of the sword he search, revealed to be Soul Edge. After he helped Talim performing the cleansing ritual on the sick boy, Yun-seong pursued Talim who left swiftly to find the sword and continued their journey together. They met Mi-na who attempted to persuade Yun-seong to go home, but he refused and left the two during their sleep one night. He eventually arrived at Ostrheinsburg and encountered his idol Hwang, again warning Yun-seong about the sword's evil nature, though it did not stop him and went about his quest anyway, parting his ways with Hwang. He does not appear in Soulcalibur V, but is mentioned in the game's artbook, where he is stated to had returned to his homeland after Soulcalibur IV, deemed a national hero, and began teaching the young generation alongside Hwang and Seong Mi-na.

Necrid

Raphael
Voiced by (English): Paul Jennings (SCII)Voiced by (Japanese): Yasunori Masutani

 is a French nobleman, exiled by his family for committing a grievance against them. Hidden from his pursuers by a young girl named Amy, he took her in as his adoptive daughter and sought Soul Edge to secure a future for both of them. He was utterly defeated in battle with Nightmare, the sword's wielder, though he managed to stab the sword, which helped Siegfried wrest his mind from its influence. Raphael and Amy contracted vampirism as a result of Soul Edge's power resonating in wounds from the battle, and the two relocated to a castle in Romania, where their vampirism led to infection among the local peasantry. However, the populace began to be healed one by one by a "Holy Stone". Feeling threatened, Raphael decided to leave the castle to find and destroy the stone. During his journey, he learned from the "creatures of the dark" that the Holy Stone was Soul Edge's counterpart Soul Calibur, which had even greater power than Soul Edge, and decided to find and use the sword to create a "perfect world" for himself and Amy. After the events of Soulcalibur IV, Raphael is stated to have died, but suddenly awoke in a dungeon cell seventeen years later with no memory of what happened and found that Amy had disappeared from his life. Determined to finish his plan, he began his search for Amy. It is heavily implied by the official artbook that Raphael has become the new vessel of Nightmare after his destruction; this is further supported by the fact that Nightmare uses Raphael's body model in the Create-A-Soul mode as well as them sharing the same voice actor in Japanese as of Soulcalibur V, therefore making Raphael the identity of "Graf Dumas".

In the new timeline of Soulcalibur VI, after his adoption of Amy and further confirm his "Graf Dumas" status, Raphael comes across a couple of secret documents by a mysterious scholar, later revealed to be new character, Azwel. With his plan for a perfect world for Amy using Soul Edge, Raphael is easily manipulated by Azwel into finding the cursed sword. It also reveals in a possible timeline where he never met Amy, Raphael would become a mindless malfested.

Raphael's appearance in Soulcalibur III was changed heavily, designed to represent his evil demeanor and royal image. The chief character designer of the game, Hideo Yoshie, stated that the change made Raphael "more distinctive".

He also appeared in Smash Court Tennis Pro Tournament 2 as an unlockable character.

Talim
Voiced by (English): Julie Parker (SCII), Kira Buckland (SCVI)
Voiced by (Japanese): Yukari Tamura

 is the granddaughter of her village's elder, and daughter of its shaman.<ref name="profile2">Soulcalibur II, Talim Character Profile</ref> Due to turmoil caused by the influences of Philippine and Spanish culture, she was reared to be its last priestess (Babaylan). The day that the Evil Seed spread across the world, Talim felt the winds, and an evil aura that devoured everything in its path surged into her body, causing her to lose consciousness for days. Years later, when Talim was fifteen years old, a man from the west brought with him a strange metal fragment, claiming it to be a vitality charm. Talim, however, recognized the evil energy as the same energy she had experienced years before and left on a journey, believing that if she were to return the fragment to its rightful place, peace would eventually be restored, despite the elders' misgivings.

Talim's weapons, originally considered for the first Soulcalibur game, were built around the concept of dual-weapon usage, with special emphasis that while bladed, the weapons themselves were not actual tonfa. During development it was considered to allow them to transform and be sentient, however the idea was abandoned. Talim's character concept was designed around the idea of introducing a young female character that the developers felt the series lacked, while at the same time making her appear androgynous.

In 2015, Talim was voted the most popular Soulcalibur character in the West in an official poll by Namco Bandai. GameNOW described her as "profoundly unique not only to SC2, but to fighting games in general." GameSpy's Christian Nutt stated Talim's "unpredictable nature" made her interesting, though added "she's almost too cute to fit in with the rest of the SCII crew." Insert Credit's Tim Rogers called Talim "the cutest of the young girl characters [in Soulcalibur II] by far," and a preference for her symmetrical outfits. The Village Voice by contrast described her outfit in Soulcalibur IV as "troubling", citing it as an example of over-sexualization in the game.

Introduced in Soulcalibur III
In addition to the characters below, several others appear within the game under the title of "bonus" characters, representing fighting styles exclusive to the game's character creation mode as unlockable characters. These include minor storyline characters such as Amy and Revenant, others from previous installments otherwise absent from the game such as Arthur, Li Long and Hwang, and characters exclusive to the game's "Chronicles of the Sword" mode. Of these, only Amy and Revenant would be included in later installments, with the former expanded into a full character and the latter appearing as a boss alongside Zasalamel.

Amy/Viola
Voiced by: Kanako Tateno (SCIII); Hitomi Nabatame (SCIV~onwards)

 was initially introduced as a background character for Raphael, as a young girl who hid him from his pursuers and taken in as his foster daughter in a debt of gratitude. To secure a future for her, he left Amy behind to pursue the cursed sword Soul Edge, with plans to present it to the nobles that pursued him so they would be overtaken by its curse and destroy each other. However he was utterly defeated by its host, and as Amy tended to his wounds both of them were infected with vampirism. They traveled to a castle in Romania, and he left her to ensure the creation of an ideal world for both of them. Amy however felt abandoned, and set out on her own to protect their world herself.

After the seventeen-year gap between Soulcalibur IV and Soulcalibur V, Amy has mysteriously disappeared, initiating Raphael's search for her. In reality, Amy has resurfaced and grown-up in the said fifth game as an amnesiac fortune-teller named , losing most of her past memories and life. Amy, now Viola begin live as a wanderer because of her inability to empathize with other peoples, until she met Z.W.E.I. The two then become traveling companions. Eventually, they are found by Siegfried, the leader of reformed Schwarzwind and took them as fugitives/mercenaries. She then assists Patroklos to find Soul Calibur under orders from Siegfried, along with Z.W.E.I., though he leaves after finding his sister, Pyrrha. It is revealed in Soulcalibur VI that Amy's transformation into an amnesiac Viola was because of Azwel's magic.

Like Raphael, Amy wields a rapier as her weapon. In her debut appearance, Amy utilizes the "Rapier" custom fighting style closely based on Raphael's moveset. In the arcade version of Soulcalibur III, she is more divergent, having moves that focused more on speed than power, unlike Raphael; this change is retained in Soulcalibur IV. First seen in Soulcalibur II opening sequence, Amy's character model was reused with a modified design in Soulcalibur III as a debug character for the developers to test elements of the game with and against, also appearing in some of the game's epilogue sequences. After completion of most of the game, they decided to implement her as a full character as a result of liking her design. When she was announced as a playable character in the sequel for Soulcalibur IV, game director Daishi Odashima stating the reason behind her inclusion as "I like weaker characters", noting her as one of his three favorite characters in the game.

As Viola, her weapons are a metal claw and a magical crystal ball which floats around during battles. Prior both Amy and Viola revealed to be a same person as of SCVI, there were numerous hints, such as having the same looks, in-game interactions with Raphael, as well as her sharing the same voice actress in both English and Japanese, allude to their connections.

Night Terror

Olcadan
Voiced by: Shigenori Sōya

 was introduced in Soulcalibur III as a warrior that mastered a variety of martial arts and weapon usage and interested in honing his skills. When he reached adulthood only one of his fights had ended in a draw, so to test himself he hunted down God of War Ares's messenger, a great snow owl and decapitated it as proof of his victory. He was cursed as a result with an owl's head depending on the position of the stars and was later imprisoned in a labyrinth where time stood still. When the seal was eventually broken, he learned of Soul Edge's power and, impressed, he sought to defeat it. During this time he also learned of currency and growing fond of it he served as an instructor to other warriors for payment.

He received positive reception as a character due to his appearance and demeanor, placing in UGO.com's Top 11 SoulCalibur Fighters article at eleventh place, beating out fellow series mimic character Charade. They additionally awarded the character "Best New Character" of 2005 and proposed the possibility of Olcadan appearing in a stand-alone title and serving as a mascot for Namco, drawing comparisons to characters such as Master Chief. The character was additionally mentioned by them in their early coverage of Soulcalibur IV, noting hope for his return in the title.

Setsuka
Voiced by (English): Kari Wahlgren (SCIII); Tara Platt (SCIV)Voiced by (Japanese): Nanaho Katsuragi (SCIII~SCIV), Yō Taichi (SCVI~)

 is a character introduced in Soulcalibur III. An orphan and runaway living in Japan, she was shunned due to her Caucasian ancestry. Eventually, she was taken in by Shugen Kokonoe, a man who worked as a bodyguard in the region. He named her Setsuka ("Snow Flower"). He taught her his fighting style, as well as showing her affection and kindness, things she had never experienced before, and gave her a beautiful, ornate kimono. After he dies from wounds sustained in combat with Mitsurugi, Setsuka realized she had fallen in love with the man. Despite his dying request not to pursue revenge she chooses to do so. She now tracks Nightmare, believing it will lead her to Mitsurugi, who himself pursues Nightmare. She continues on her search for Mitsurugi in Soulcalibur IV. She is given no mention in Soulcalibur V, although she appears briefly in the official artbook of the game, where she shattered Mitsurugi's sword in a duel but lost the battle, took the name "Neve" and began to teach students her fighting style in Istanbul, one of which was Patroklos. She told him not to pursue revenge as she had before, though he ultimately ignored the advice in his search for Pyrrha.

She returns in Soulcalibur VI as a DLC character. The new timeline gives further details on her close relationship with Shugen and how she came to lose him, as well as her birth heritage as a Portuguese-Japanese. Although she initially listens to her master's request not to avenge him, Setsuka decides to pursues Mitsurugi after a fight with the mysterious Kokonoe clan over hidden scrolls with secret advanced fighting techniques, and eventually leads her to be involved with Soul Edge-related incidents.

Character developer Hideo Yoshie stated that Setsuka's concept originated from the idea of a flower. Her outfit in Soulcalibur III was inspired by historical Japanese courtesans known as oiran, who wore cosmetics and clothing similar to a geisha's but tied their obi at the front instead of behind, mixed with elements from the Queen of Hearts as part of an "East-meets-West" concept.

Tira

Zasalamel
Voiced by (English): Keith SilversteinVoiced by (Japanese): Hiroshi Tsuchida

 hails from an ancient tribe that was tasked with the protection of the holy sword Soul Calibur by Algol. Angered by the tribe's restrictions, he tried to take Soul Calibur but was caught and exiled. Pursuing the sword he gained the ability to reincarnate, though eventually yearned to die for good. Tracking down Soul Edge, he manipulated events so that Soul Calibur would come to him, serving as the main antagonist of Soulcalibur III. Hoping to use the combined energies of the swords to end his existence, he was instead transformed into a monster called Abyss. During these events he had a vision of the future, and desiring to see it firsthand he returned to life, acting in Soulcalibur IV to protect the swords in case their destruction broke his cycle of reincarnation. His further fate afterward is unknown, as he is given no mention in Soulcalibur V.

Zasalamel reappears in the new timeline of Soulcalibur VI, which revisits the events of the first Soulcalibur game, as a foreseer of the future.

Zasalamel was positively received. Official U.S. PlayStation Magazine described Zasalamel as "easily the coolest" of the three new characters introduced in Soulcalibur III, noting his speed and ability to pull opponents to him. Other reviewers have shared the sentiments, praising his accessibility for new players. GameSpy went further to describe him as one of the best characters in Soulcalibur III, noting his offensive abilities and range control.

Introduced in Soulcalibur Legends
Iska Farkas
Voiced by: Romi Park

Iska is one of the key characters in Soulcalibur Legends. Despite being initially presented as an ally, he is eventually revealed to be the main antagonist, having manipulated the characters into retrieving Soul Edge and Soul Calibur for his use. He is a refugee and Hungarian prince who serves as a court jester for a Masked Emperor. Iska has heterochromia with one blue eye and one red eye. His belts also correspond to this trait. He was born in Buda who lived with his sister Ilona until the usurper sultan, Barbaros, attacked the city and destroyed it, though his sister allowed him to escape with his life by sacrificing herself. Iska then went around the world looking for shelter, but all those that took him in eventually betrayed and used him, and then he studied under the famous alchemist Paracelsus who taught him much at Basel, until Iska disappeared, stealing Paracelsus's notes on the creation of false humans and was said to have made at least one successful artificial human. He thought up a crazed scheme to take over the world using the swords Soul Calibur and Soul Edge, to gain power for his lost sister. He used Paracelsus's notes to create a homunculus, made to look in the form of his sister. She managed to become the Masked Emperor of the Holy Roman Empire. He faked a story of being brought in by the "Masked Emperor" and becomes her court jester. His scheme comes into effect, as his homunculus has Siegfried and several other companions reluctantly agree to help the Holy Roman Empire against Barbaros of the Ottoman Empire (who wields Soul Calibur) by strengthening Soul Edge, which Siegfried wields. Iska is very persuasive in keeping his comrades to uphold their agreements and constantly reminisces about missing his sister and his home, lamenting his weakness, and wishes that he had strength and power which he did not have then to survive the pains of his life. After Soul Edge regains power and Siegfried kills Barbaros, claiming Soul Calibur, the "Masked Emperor" claims Soul Edge and tries to attack Siegfried and claim Soul Edge for Iska. However, a new version of the Evil Seed comes from Soul Calibur as the two swords clash, knocking Siegfried far away. Siegfried ends up sealing Soul Edge's power after realizing that he killed his own father at the peak of the Himalayas, however keeps it. He also gets Requiem here. The group storms Vienna to defeat the Emperor, and after Siegfried does, he plants Soul Edge into the ground alongside Soul Calibur. Iska then claims them (restoring Soul Edge's power using Soul Calibur), revealing his scheme to Siegfried. He then attempts to kill Siegfried, but Siegfried instead wins and Iska dies. During the credits there are two graves that say Iska Farkas and Ilona Farkas. Siegfried keeps Soul Edge, eventually succumbing to the Evil Seed and becoming Nightmare.

Ilona Farkas
Voiced by: Atsuko Tanaka

Iska Farkas' sister who got taken by Barbaros. Iska is always mumbling about Ilona and how he regrets not saving her. When Barbaros attacked Hungary, Iska fled but forgot Ilona. The Masked Emperor was made to look like her, revealed at the end of Soulcalibur Legends. Before his death, Iska starts to say something to her, but it is cut off. Their graves are shown at the credits, showing that Ilona did die or at least had a headstone dedicated to her.

Barbaros
Voiced by: Kenji Nomura

Sultan Barbaros originally appears to be the main villain in Soulcalibur Legends. He was once the leader of a band of thieves when his band discovered Soulcalibur in the home of a general. Barbara, part of the same gang stated that Barbaros changed personality-wise when he claimed Soulcalibur. The spirit sword bestowed Barbaros with immense power, causing him to grow into a giant and allowed him to conquer the Ottoman Empire where he crowned himself sultan. He fought against the Holy Roman Empire, leading an army of Evils (monsters) to lay siege to the city of Vienna. The Masked Emperor enlisted the help of Siegfried to regain the shards of Soul Edge and combat Barbaros since Soul Edge was the only weapon that could stand up to Barbaros and Soulcalibur. After recovering all the shards Siegfried battled Barbaros and defeated him, causing Soulcalibur to emerge from his forehead.

Fafnir
After the Evil Seed event in Soulcalibur Legends, Fafnir the dragon appears as a boss character in the game. Fafnir was the first dragon and that all the myths about dragons all over the world were inspired by him. He was slain by the hero Sigmund (whom Siegfried is named after) who slew the dragon using his sword Requiem. According to the legend, Sigmund asked his friend to reforge his broken sword, Gram, who gave his life for the sword. In his grief, Sigmund renamed the sword Requiem in honor of his friend and after defeating Fafnir he placed Requiem in an altar in the ancient Cathedral where Fafnir roosted. In the 16th century Fafnir is one of the Guardians that holds a shard of Soul Edge. The heroes need to enlist the aid of a scientist named Leonardo who claimed to have invented a weapon that could kill a dragon, which were needed because Fafnir could not be fought while in the air by conventional means. With these weapons Siegfried and Ivy are able to slay Fafnir and recover the shard. Later on Fafnir and the other guardians are revived by Soulcalibur but are slain once again by Siegfried.

Introduced in Soulcalibur IV and Broken Destiny
In addition to these characters, with Soulcalibur IV several manga and anime character designers were invited to contribute additional, non-canon characters to the game: Angol Fear (voiced by Takako Honda), a female alien designed by Mine Yoshizaki and cousin of his existing character Angol Mois; Ashlotte (voiced by Hitomi Nabatame), a mechanical doll developed by Oh! great sent to destroy series character Astaroth; Kamikirimusi (voiced by Nami Kurokawa), a young female oni designed by Hirokazu Hisayuki searching for kindred spirits; Scheherazade (voiced by Nami Kurokawa), an elven storyteller designed by Yutaka Izubuchi and based on the Persian queen of the same name; and Shura (voiced by Takako Honda), a possessed female warrior designed by Hiroya Oku. Rather than having a unique fighting style, each was modeled after an existing character: Seong Mi-na, Astaroth, Nightmare, Amy, and Cervantes, respectively. Of these characters, only Ashlotte is referenced in later games, alluded to in Astaroth's Soulcalibur Vs profile information.

Algol
Voiced by: Jōji Nakata

 serves as the Story Mode boss for most characters and as an unlockable character in Soulcalibur IV. Prior to the events of Soul Edge, Algol was known as "The Hero King", able to use the cursed sword Soul Edge without being controlled by it. He used it to forge an era of peace, until his son was possessed by the sword and Algol was forced to destroy them both. He worked to create a purified sword from a shard of Soul Edge to counter the weapon when it reappeared, resulting in the creation of Soul Calibur but with his body and soul trapped inside until the two swords clashed. Freed, he constructed himself a new body armed with facsimiles of both swords, and waited for them to come to him so that he could make his revival permanent. After the events of Soulcalibur IV, Algol had been working to corrupt the world with energies from Astral Chaos in order to control it. His actions had caused much disturbance of the world, with Edge Master even entering Astral Chaos to prevent him.

Character designer Hideo Yoshie described Algol as "a character that obviously proves the setting of being the strongest character ever in the Soulcalibur series". Algol's costume was designed around the concept of originating from a culture so ancient that it was not recorded in history, which complicated the character's creation. After considering several themes including a lion and a dinosaur, a bird motif was finally settled upon. An option was considered for Algol to cause an "off site brawl" while on a pipe chair, but was unused. His design elements including his projectile-firing "rifle arm" were called fresh and innovative by Gameswelt. The staff of 1UP.com were particularly impressed by his rifle attack, nicknaming the projectiles "Soul Bubbles" in reference to a game by the same name. Kotaku also praised the character, describing him as "much more of a bad ass" than recurring series boss Inferno. Edge described him as breaking the tradition of "ill-balanced uber-enemies" as well as one able to use a gun as a weapon without seeming "hopelessly out of place" in the series. GameAxis Unwired praised the character for breaking the series' tradition of bosses that mimicked existing fighting styles, and added that Algol remained for the most part fair to fight against. Neoseeker stated that Algol felt as if he was "just there, purely for your entertainment", calling his fighting style bizarre but while frustrating to fight, beatable. Cheat Code Central included Algol in the 2012 list of top ten hidden characters in fighting games.

Dampierre
Voiced by: Shigeru Chiba

 is a con artist introduced in Soulcalibur: Broken Destiny and known by a variety of titles, amongst which include "Alchemist of the Ages", "The World's Greatest Assassin", and "Miraculous Psychic". He eventually became recognized as a thief, and resorted to robbery and kidnapping to continue his rich lifestyle. Desiring to live a noble life instead, he decides to fight against Nightmare and use his skills for good. In Soulcalibur V, he had heard about the new king of Hungary, Graf Dumas (actually Nightmare in disguise) had prepared for wars, so Dampierre arranges a meeting with him. His weapons consist of two spring mounted daggers strapped to the underside of his wrists. He is voiced by Shigeru Chiba in Japanese, who the developers felt gave the character a distinct voice.

Dampierre's introduction in the game was the result of the amount of unused character and weapon designs that were excluded from Soulcalibur IV, and the team's desire to instead focus on creating a character based around their personality instead. Though the development team had mixed feelings regarding the character, they chose to take a risk and add him to Broken Destiny regardless.

Hilde

Introduced in Soulcalibur V
Elysium
Voiced by: Chie Nakamura

 is the physical manifestation of Soul Calibur, taking the form of an angelic woman who, due to Patroklos's influence, resembles Sophitia. Her goal is to destroy everything related to Soul Edge and will do anything to achieve it, even if it means by destroying the innocent "malfested". She guides Patroklos to destroy Soul Edge using Soul Calibur with the promise that she will help him find his sister Pyrrha, though she already knows that Pyrrha is a malfested and must be vanquished. She is successful in convincing Patroklos to kill Pyrrha, though Edge Master's giving of a second chance prevents Patroklos from doing so. Angry, she traps Patroklos in a crystal and confronts him in his subconscious to reveal her intentions and tries to possess Patroklos in order to destroy Soul Edge, though in the end she is defeated and eventually destroyed by Patroklos and Pyrrha along with Soul Calibur.

Along with Edge Master and Kilik, she is a mimic character in Soulcalibur V, mimicking the styles of female characters. Uniquely, she has a few unique moves when she mimics Pyrrha Omega, which are actually Sophitia's moves, and has a different Critical Edge unlike other mimic characters.

Leixia
Voiced by (English): Lauren LandaVoiced by (Japanese): Yoshino Nanjō

 is the daughter of Xianghua and a Chinese general whom she married after parting ways with Kilik. She was trained in the arts of Chinese swordplay using a Jian by her mother. During her fifteenth birthday, she was given a collar containing a shard of Kilik's anti-evil mirror, Dvapara-Yuga, by her younger brother, Leixin, as a present. When she showed it to her mother, Xianghua grew frantic and planned to have Leixia marry a Chinese general, troubling Leixia who decided to leave her home to learn why her mother had reacted to the sight of the pendant. Befriending the ninja Natsu, they joined Maxi and Xiba in traveling the world.

According to the game's official artbook, SOULCALIBUR – New Legends of Project Soul, Xiba, one of Leixia's travel companion is actually her estranged older half-brother, the result of her mother's intimate meeting with Kilik. The reason why Xianghua had gone frantic at the sight of Dvapara-Yuga and decided to arrange Leixia's marriage with a general is because the pendant reminded her of Kilik and Xianghua does not want her daughter to have an illegal affair like the former had with Kilik.

Natsu
Voiced by: Fuyuka Ōura

 is a young ninja and the disciple of Taki. She wields two kodachi and harbors the demon  inside her, who was sealed by Taki after his previous container was killed. Because of this, she was treated as an outcast by her community and was very shy as a young girl, though she eventually grew her confidence with the help of Taki. After Taki failed to return from a mission, promising to return within two weeks, Natsu grew worried, and after Leixia arrived at Fu-Ma village gates, she became a bodyguard to Leixia, hoping she could find her beloved master along the way.

Natsu also appears in Project X Zone 2 as a playable solo unit.

Patroklos
Voiced by (English): Yuri LowenthalVoiced by (Japanese): KENN

 is the main protagonist of Soulcalibur V. He is Sophitia's son, and uses a short sword and a shield like his mother, though his alternate version,  hides his true fighting style: an iaido swordplay, taught to him by Setsuka after his father's death. Patroklos' sister, Pyrrha, was abducted by Tira when he was only two years old. His mother, Sophitia left their home in search for her, but she never returned. His father, Rothion had tried to search for her and simultaneously kept the truth from the family until seventeen years later, when he caught an unexplainable sickness. Before his death, he told Patroklos everything about their family. Patroklos left his home in search for Pyrrha and eventually become a slayer of malfested under the order of Graf Dumas, the king of Hungary. However, his meeting with Z.W.E.I. severs his ties with the king upon learning he has been manipulated. Under the guidance of a mysterious voice from Soul Calibur (which is Elysium), he continues his duty on killing the malfested. He is eventually reunited with his sister, but has difficulty accepting her as a malfested. After killing her during a duel, he receives words of advice from Edge Master in Astral Chaos, while also rekindling his true fighting style. Patroklos returns to an earlier point in time, and is given a second chance to save Pyrrha. He is able to do so, but is confronted by Elysium who tries to possess Patroklos, though he manages to defeat her and seals Soul Calibur with Soul Edge, after which he is able to accept Pyrrha and lives on with her.

Fan reception to Patroklos has been significantly negative, with the majority condemning him as the series' "Most Hated Character."

Pyrrha
Voiced by (English): Laura Bailey Voiced by (Japanese): Nozomi Sasaki

 is Patroklos' sister and Sophitia's daughter who uses her mother's sword and shield which were made by her father, Rothion. Pyrrha was kidnapped by Tira when she was only three years old in order to torment Sophitia. She knows nothing about her past, other than the fact that everyone that was close to her strangely died, which earns her the title "Bringer of Woe". She was imprisoned after being accused of killing a nobleman's son who purchased her from a slave market. It was that time Tira appears and took care of her. However, her only reason on doing that is to make Pyrrha a new vessel for Soul Edge since she already knew that Pyrrha's body contained parts of Soul Edge's power. To charge up the demonic powers, Tira orders Pyrrha to kill people, promising her that she will take Pyrrha to reunite with her long lost brother, Patroklos. The two eventually reunite, but the influence of the Soul Edge manages to corrupt her, turning her into , with a deformed arm much like Nightmare's and wielding Soul Edge as a sword and shield like her mother did. Patroklos is unable to accept her form and later kills her during a duel. With the aid of Edge Master within Astral Chaos, he is able to go back in time, and alter the past event, granting himself a second chance. Patroklos prevails against Pyrrha in battle, and disarms her; therefore freeing her from Soul Edge's control. After Patroklos' final confrontation with Elysium, Pyrrha pierces Soul Calibur with Soul Edge and returns home, having been accepted by Patroklos.

Outside of the series, Pyrrha is the main character of Queen's Gate: Pyrrha (蒼運命に翻弄される娘 ピュラ), an erotic gamebook as part of the Queen's Gate series.

Xiba
Voiced by: Toshiyuki Toyonaga

 is described as an honest young man who came from the Zhen Hang Mountain. He has a strong love for food and would repeatedly strive for it, much to the annoyance of his companion, Leixia. Like Kilik, he was trained in the secret arts of the Ling-Sheng Su by his master, Kong Xiuqiang. Sometime before the events of the game, he was bequeathed with Kilik's inheritance, the sacred bō staff Kali-Yuga, under orders of Edge Master, who sensed Kilik's tragic fate. Together with Leixia, Natsu, and their leader, Maxi, Xiba travels throughout the world, eventually helping Patroklos to complete Soul Calibur with Kali-Yuga's power (as well as Dvapara Yuga's, owned by Leixia).

According to the official artbook of the game, SOULCALIBUR – New Legends of Project Soul'', he is actually Kilik and Xianghua's son and Leixia's estranged older half-brother. His birth is the result of their intimate meeting and he was nearly killed following the orders of the Xianghua's grandfather. Negotiations with Ming Empire general Yan Wujin however, allowed Xiba to live secretly with Xianghua's father Kong Xiuqiang so as to not revealing the scandal as the condition for Wujin to marry Xianghua. As many others such as Goku from Dragon Ball, his look and fighting style is based on Sun Wukong from the classic Chinese novel, Journey to the West.

Z.W.E.I.
Voiced by (English): Matthew MercerVoiced by (Japanese): Kenta Miyake

 is a mysterious, brooding man who wields a sword with three handles and can summon a lupine spirit named "E.I.N.", who is actually Minion, a secondary soul that coexists with Z.W.E.I.'s own human soul. While much of his backstory is unknown, the official site states that he was separated from his mother when he was still a child, and he had to endure hardships in his life before he was eventually taken by the leader of Schwarzwind, Siegfried, who raised him as a warrior. Z.W.E.I. is currently traveling with Viola, a woman who also has inhuman powers like himself. Z.W.E.I. advises Patroklos to revolt against Dumas as he had merely used him and later assists him in finding Soul Calibur under orders from Siegfried, alongside Viola, though he leaves them after finding his sister, Pyrrha. Later, when Nightmare has declared war across Europe, he confronts him in his castle and manages to kill him. However, a malfested Pyrrha appears and stabs him, after which he falls to the chasm, his fate unknown.

Introduced in Soulcalibur VI

Azwel
Voiced by: Masashi Ebara

 is a man of extraordinary intelligence and a scholar in many fields, including history, medicine, war, and art. His studies about the history of humanity brought him to the conclusion that humanity would self-destruct through wars and other calamities. His fanatical love for the people led him to enact a terrifying plan to save them from themselves. Azwel also infects Grøh with Soul Edge, defects from the Aval Organization, manipulates Raphael into searching for Soul Edge, and assaults Amy to discover her future self as Viola.

His weapon is a pair of gloves named Palindrome: the right glove includes a fragment of Soul Edge, while the left one has a piece of Soul Calibur. Azwel draws his power from the memories of past battles, preserved within those fragments. While he appears unarmed, his gloves allow him to summon a variety of deadly weapons, which he can use with brutal effects.

Grøh
Voiced by (English): Xander MobusVoiced by (Japanese): Takahiro Sakurai

 is a member of the mysterious Aval Organization, a secret group with origins rooted in ancient times, who came to be when a king used the spirit sword to defeat its cursed counterpart, and with his dying breath, entrusted them with both the blade and his unfinished mission. Each new generation has taken on the group's mission to rid the world of “Outsiders” — those connected with the cursed sword, the Malfested. Aval Organization had been a sworn allied force to Hilde's home kingdom, the Wolfkrone for generations. Little is known about him, save for that he was a fearsome warrior. Though his fighting style is shrouded in mystery, he wields two swords that can connect with each other.

He was turned into an “Outsider” by Nightmare, and progressively continued by the traitor Azwel, the man who responsible for infected Grøh and his best friend, Curtis, for the sorcerer's evil experiments. After having remaining willpower to negate his mind from becoming an “Outsider”, using the power of “Outsider” to counteract the likes of “Outsiders”-minded warriors, Azwel included, Grøh found a new purpose to put the fellow “Outsider” victims like him a trial whether they have a strong will left to suppress the malfestation or not. Following Maxi’s first victor against Astaroth, shortly before Kilik finally purifies his malfestation and helps Xianghua defeats Nightmare/Inferno, Grøh was the one of found a critically injured Maxi. Unbeknownst to Grøh, Curtis survives but suffers amnesia and becomes a malfested army. Although Curtis slowly begins to recover his memory of Grøh before a one year war depicted in 1590 A.D. begins.

References

Lists of Namco characters
 
Lists of video game characters